Events from the year 1709 in art.

Events
 The Baroque church of Santa María Magdalena, Seville, is completed.

Paintings
 Paolo Baronni – Frescoes in the Basilica of St Denis.
 Giuseppe Maria Crespi – The Flea.
 Sir Godfrey Kneller Portraits of Admirals Sir John Jennings and Sir Stafford Fairborne.
 Kanō Tsunenobu – Portrait of a Japanese official.

Births
 March 22 – Giuseppe Zais, Italian painter of landscapes (vedutisti) (died 1784)
 June 11 – Joachim Martin Falbe, German portrait painter (died 1782)
 December 24 – Johann Evangelist Holzer, Austrian-German painter (died 1740)
 date unknown
 Giuseppe Angeli, Italian painter of the late-baroque active mainly in Venice (died 1798)
 Philipp Hieronymus Brinckmann, German painter and engraver (died 1761)
 John Cheere, English sculptor (died 1787)
 Johann Michael Feuchtmayer, German stucco sculptor and plasterer (died 1772)
 Jean Girardet, French painter of portrait miniatures (died 1778)
 Violante Beatrice Siries, Italian painter (died 1783)

Deaths
 April 2 – Giovanni Battista Gaulli, Italian painter (born 1639)
 April 5 – Roger de Piles, French painter, engraver, art critic and diplomat (born 1635)
 August 31 – Andrea Pozzo, Italian Baroque architect, decorator, stage designer, painter, and art theoretician (born 1642)
 September – Thomas Quellinus, Flemish sculptor (born 1661)
 December 7 – Meindert Hobbema, Dutch landscape painter (born 1638)
 date unknown
 Jean-Baptiste Boyer d’Éguilles, French engraver, painter, and collector (born 1650)
 Geronimo de Bobadilla, Spanish painter (born 1630)
 Antonio Franchi, Italian painter active mainly in Florence and Lucca (born 1638)
 Bartolomeo Guidobono, Italian painter, active mainly in Northern Italy (born 1654)
 Henry Gyles, English glass painter (born 1640)
 Johan Teyler, Dutch Golden Age painter and engraver (born 1648)
 Yu Zhiding, Chinese landscape painter during the Qing Dynasty (born 1647)

 
Years of the 18th century in art
1700s in art